This is a list of flag bearers who have represented Dominica at the Olympics.

Flag bearers carry the national flag of their country at the opening ceremony of the Olympic Games.

See also
Dominica at the Olympics

References

Dominica at the Olympics
Dominica
Olympic flagbearers